Enrique Gómez Iturbe (born 24 January 2004) is a Mexican professional footballer who plays as a midfielder for Liga MX club Toluca.

Career statistics

Club

References

External links
 
 
 

Living people
2004 births
Association football midfielders
Deportivo Toluca F.C. players
Liga MX players
Footballers from the State of Mexico
Mexican footballers